The 2000 Paraguayan coup d'état attempt was a political crisis that occurred in Paraguay in May 2000, with the aim of deposing then President of Paraguay Luis Ángel González Macchi and arresting some "anti-oviedista" members of Congress. The attempted coup was led by a group that called itself "Fulgencio Yegros Patriotic Movement", formed by at least fifty soldiers, most of them retired and loyal to former General Lino Oviedo, who at the time was in political exile.

Events
On 18 May 2000, around 10:00 pm, troops loyal to former General Lino Oviedo rebelled against the government of President of Paraguay Luis Ángel González Macchi. The group called itself "Fulgencio Yegros Patriotic Movement", in honor of Paraguayan independence hero Fulgencio Yegros, and proposed rebellion as the only alternative to change a government that, according to them, was "illegitimate". This insurgent group was made up of at least fifty retired soldiers, accompanied by lower-ranking officers.

Insurgents took over the Cavalry Regiment, the police headquarters, an elite police unit, the Special Police Operations Force (FOPE, Fuerza de Operaciones Policiales Especiales), the Canal 13 television channel, radio stations Radio Cardinal and Radio 970, among others. Five tanks went to the center of Asunción and fired at the Congress building (now Cultural Center of the Republic). Although loyal forces exchanged fire with the rebels, there were no casualties. Apparently, the original plan was not fulfilled and failed. In Caazapá and Villarrica there were also reports that rebels occupied certain places.

At 1:30 am on 19 May, the Executive Branch decreed a state of exception in effect for 30 days throughout the national territory, as a result of the attempted coup d'état. At the time, Oviedo (in hiding since December 1999) denied that these acts were related to him. This coup attempt (the second in less than five years) is considered to be a consequence of Marzo paraguayo, a period of great political instability.

At least thirty high-ranking military officers were detained in the presidential guard, including several retired army generals and colonels. At least four deputies and several politicians belonging to the UNACE movement (at the time not yet a political party), which Lino Oviedo led in hiding, were also detained.

Several countries, such as Brazil and the United States, and the Permanent Council of the Organization of American States (OAS), "vehemently" condemned the coup attempt and expressed their support for the González Macchi government.

See also
1989 Paraguayan coup d'état
1996 Paraguayan coup d'état attempt
Marzo paraguayo

References

Military coups in Paraguay
History of Paraguay
2000 in Paraguay
May 2000 events in South America
Conflicts in 2000
2000s coups d'état and coup attempts
Paraguay, 2000